The 2010–11 Ryobi One-Day Cup was the 41st season of the National One Day Cup, the official List A domestic cricket in Australia. The season began on 6 October 2010 when Queensland Bulls played the Tasmanian Tigers.

The season marked the commencement of a new limited overs format which includes 45 overs per team of 12 players with a split innings of 20 and 25 overs.

Table

Fixture

October

November

December

February

Final

Statistics

Highest team totals
The following table lists the six highest team scores during this season.

Last Updated 31 December 2010.

Most runs
The top five highest run scorers (total runs) in the season are included in this table.

Last Updated 25 February 2010.

Highest scores
This table contains the top five highest scores of the season made by a batsman in a single innings.

Last Updated 31 December 2010.

Most wickets
The following table contains the five leading wicket-takers of the season.

Last Updated 19 February 2010.

Best bowling figures
This table lists the top five players with the best bowling figures in the season.

Last Updated 18 February 2010.

References

External links 
 Official website for 2010–11 season

2010-11
Ryobi One-Day Cup
Ryobi One-Day Cup